Alfonso Milián Sorribas (15 January 1939 – 26 November 2020) was a Spanish Roman Catholic bishop.

Milián Sorribas was born in Spain and was ordained to the priesthood in 1962. He served as titular bishop of Diana and as Auxiliary bishop of the Roman Catholic Archdiocese of Zaragoza, Spain, from 2000 to 2004 and as bishop of the Roman Catholic Diocese of Barbastro-Monzón, Spain, from 2004 to 2014.

Notes

1939 births
2020 deaths
21st-century Roman Catholic bishops in Spain